The 1960 United States presidential election in Iowa took place on November 8, 1960, as part of the 1960 United States presidential election. Voters chose ten representatives, or electors, to the Electoral College, who voted for president and vice president.

Iowa was won by incumbent Vice President Richard Nixon (R–California), running with United States Ambassador to the United Nations Henry Cabot Lodge, Jr., with 56.71% of the popular vote, against Senator John F. Kennedy (D–Massachusetts), running with Senator Lyndon B. Johnson, with 43.22% of the popular vote. , this is the last election in which Johnson County, home to Iowa City and the University of Iowa, voted for a Republican presidential candidate.

Kennedy became the fourth American president to have ever held office without carrying Iowa in an election.

Primaries

Democratic precinct caucuses

While no statewide vote was held, a system of precinct caucuses were used to select delegates. Edward A. McDermott led a, first-of-its-kind- coordinated effort for the Kennedy campaign which sought to shape the results of Iowa's precinct caucuses in order to secure an Iowa delegation which favored Kennedy's candidacy. These precinct caucuses had been largely ignored by most political circles, providing an opportunity for Kennedy. His campaign had been targeting Iowa as a top priority state in its delegate strategy since, at latest, 1959, setting a goal to secure the support of 18 of the state's 26 delegates.

For years, Kennedy had been seeking to curry favor with Iowa's Democratic governor, Herschel Loveless, who had fiercely opposed Kennedy's effort to secure the vice-presidential nomination at the 1956 Democratic National Convention. Kennedy hoped to persuade Loveless against putting himself forward in 1960 as a favorite son (carrying the support of his state's delegation for himself in order to leave it united and unbound to any top contender). Loveless had been neutral for a long time, and continued to remain open to a multitude of candidates as well as a prospect of running as a favorite son (perhaps leveraging that as a means of securing the vice-presidential nomination). However, Kennedy began to secure more and more grassroots support in Iowa.

McDermott heavily organized in Iowa, more than compensating for the potential disadvantage Kennedy held due to the fact that a number of possible opponents (such as Hubert Humphrey, Stuart Symington, and Adlai Stevenson II) came from states which directly neighbored Iowa. In the Spring of 1959, McDermott founded the "Iowans for Kennedy" political club and appointed Lumond F. Wilcox, a leading Medodist figure in the state, as its co-chairman in an effort to alleviate the concerns many Iowans still held about Kennedy's Catholic faith.

McDermott also recruited Iowan Democrats to run at local precinct caucuses.

By late autumn, a Des Moines Register poll of the Iowa Democratic Party's 99 county party chairmen showed that the county leaders had come to favor Kennedy 3 to 2 over Symington and 3 to 1 over either Stevenson of Humphrey.

General election

Results

Results by county

See also
 United States presidential elections in Iowa

References

Iowa
1960
1960 Iowa elections